Ariadna Sergeyevna Èfron (26 July 1975) was a Russian translator of prose and poetry, memoirist, artist, art critic, poet (her original poems, except for those written in childhood, were not printed during her lifetime); she was a daughter of Sergei Èfron and Marina Tsvetaeva.

Life

Early life
Èfron's parents and relatives called Ariadna Alya; her mother Tsvetaeva devoted a large number of poems to her (including the cycle "Poems to her Daughter"). Èfron herself wrote poems from early childhood (20 poems were published by her mother in her collection "Psyche"), and she kept diaries. In 1922, she went abroad with her mother.

Emigration
From 1922 to 1925, Èfron lived in Czechoslovakia, and from 1925 to 1937 in France, from where, on 18 March 1937, she was the first of her family to return to the USSR.

In Paris, she graduated from the Duperré School of Applied Arts, where she studied book design, engraving, lithography, and from the École du Louvre where she majored in art history.

She worked for the French magazines Russie d'Aujourd'hui ('Russia Today'), France-URSS ('France-URSS'), Pour-Vous ('For You'), as well as for the pro-Soviet magazine Nash Soviet ('Our Union'), which was published by the "Union of Returning Soviet Citizens" (Союз возвращенцев на Родину). She wrote articles and essays and produced translations, illustrations). Her translations in to French included works by Mayakovsky and other Soviet poets.

The "Union of Returning Soviet Citizens" was in fact a cover organization of the NKVD, but Èfron accepted this and supplied the NKVD information on exiled Russians and those wanting to return to the USSR.

After the return to the USSR
After returning to the USSR, Èfron worked in the editorial board of the Soviet magazine Revue de Moscou (published in French). She wrote articles, essays, reports, made illustrations and produced translations.

In prison camps and in exile
On 27 August 1939, Èfron was arrested by the NKVD and convicted by the OSO under article 58-6 (espionage) to 8 years of forced labour in labour camps. She was tortured and forced to testify against her father. She only learned afterwards about the death of her parents in 1941 (her mother committed suicide in the evacuation in Yelabuga, and her father was shot).

In the spring of 1943, Èfron refused to cooperate with the camp leadership and become a "snitch", and she was transferred to a logging camp in the Sevzheldorlag, a penal camp. An actress of the camp theater, Tamara Slanskaya, managed to ask someone for an envelope so she could write her husband, Gurevich: "If you want to save Alya, try to rescue her from the North." According to Slanskaya, "pretty soon he managed to get her transferred to Mordovia, to Potma".

After her release in 1948, she worked as a teacher of graphics at the art college in Ryazan. After long years of isolation, she felt a great need to communicate with friends, and her life was brightened by correspondence with friends, who included Boris Pasternak who sent her his new poems and chapters from his forthcoming novel Doctor Zhivago. She was so impressed by the book that she wrote to Pasternak:

Èfron was again arrested on 22 February 1949 and sentenced, on the basis of her previous conviction, to a life in exile in the Turukhansky District of the Krasnoyarsk Krai. Thanks to her education in France, she was able to work in Turukhansk as an artist-designer in the cultural center of the local district. She produced a series of watercolor sketches about life in exile, some of which were first published only in 1989.

In 1955, she was rehabilitated as there was no proof of criminal activity. She now returned to Moscow, where in 1962 she became a member of the Union of Soviet Writers. In the 1960s and 1970s, she lived in one of the buildings of the ZhSK of the Union of Soviet Writer" (Krasnoarmeyskaya St., 23).

Death
From her youth, Èfron had a heart condition; she suffered several heart attacks.

She died in a hospital in Tarusa from a massive heart attack on 26 July 1975 and was buried in the town cemetery. Tarusa is a small town 102 km from Moscow which had been a popular place for writers and artists, including Marina Tsvetayeva's parents who had had a villa there. During the Soviet era, many members of the dissident intelligentsia had settled in Tarusa, as they were forbidden to live less than 100 km from Moscow.

Èfron edited for publication works of her mother and took care of her archives. She left behind her memoirs, which were published in the magazines Literaturnaja Armenija- ja Zvezda. She had also produced a lot of translations of poetry, mainly the works of French poets, such as Victor Hugo, Charles Baudelaire, Paul Verlaine, Théophile Gautier, etc. She also wrote many original poems, which were only published in the 1990s.

Publications

 .

Literature

References

External links

Soviet writers in French
Soviet painters
Russian people of Jewish descent
Gulag detainees
Soviet rehabilitations
1912 births
1975 deaths
Soviet translators